Easby may refer to:

Places in England
Easby, Hambleton, North Yorkshire
Easby Moor
Easby, Richmondshire, North Yorkshire
Easby Abbey
Easby Hall

People
George Meade Easby (1918–2005), American actor and producer
Joseph Easby (1867–1915), English cricketer

Other
Easby Cross, an Anglo-Saxon standing cross held by the Victoria and Albert Museum